James Ellingson Cox was a professional American football guard. He was a member of the San Francisco 49ers of the All-America Football Conference.

After football, Cox worked as an attorney in Contra Costa County. In 1955, he investigated boxing and wrestling practices for the California State Athletic Commission, looking for ties to organized crime, and for a rumored conspiracy to monopolize matches.

References

Players of American football from St. Louis
San Francisco 49ers (AAFC) players
American football offensive guards
California Golden Bears football players
California lawyers
Stanford Cardinal football players
1920 births
2014 deaths
20th-century American lawyers
San Francisco 49ers players